The U.S. Highways in Wyoming are the segments of the United States Numbered Highway System owned and maintained by the Wyoming Department of Transportation.


List

Special routes

See also

References

External links

 
U.S. Highways